Gyadikvank (also, Gyadikvank’, Koturvan, Kodukh-Vank, Gyadigvank) is a former town in the Vayots Dzor Province of Armenia.

See also
 Vayots Dzor Province

References 

Populated places in Vayots Dzor Province

Former populated places in the Caucasus